Brenard Kenric Wilson (born August 15, 1955), is a former professional American football safety in the National Football League for the Philadelphia Eagles from 1979 to 1987. He played college football at Vanderbilt University.

NFL career

As a rookie in 1979, Wilson took over from John Sanders as the Eagle starting free safety, doing a credible job with 4 interceptions. In 1980 and 1981, he had 6 and 5 interceptions, respectively. With Wilson and Randy Logan as the strong-side safety, the Eagles won the NFC Championship Game of the 1980-81 NFL playoffs against the Dallas Cowboys, but lost Super Bowl XV to the Oakland Raiders. In 1982, he had only 1 interception and was replaced in 1983 by Wes Hopkins, who had greater range in the defensive secondary. He had only 1 more interception before retiring.

1955 births
Living people
Sportspeople from Daytona Beach, Florida
Players of American football from Florida
American football safeties
Vanderbilt Commodores football players
Philadelphia Eagles players
Atlanta Falcons players